Thomas David Bayliss (born 6 April 1999) is an English professional footballer who plays as a midfielder for League One club Shrewsbury Town.

Club career

Coventry City
Bayliss made his professional debut coming on as a substitute on 7 November 2017 in a 2–1 EFL Trophy win over West Brom U23's, coming on to replace Dion Kelly-Evans. He made his second appearance in the FA Cup second round against Boreham Wood. He made his league debut on 16 December, and scored within two minutes, as Coventry recorded a 2–1 victory over Cheltenham Town. He scored 6 goals for Coventry City during the 2017–18 season to help them gain promotion back to EFL League One.

Preston North End
Bayliss completed a move to Championship side Preston North End on 2 August 2019, signing a four year deal for an undisclosed fee believed to be around £1.2 million.

Wigan Athletic (loan)
On 27 August 2021, Bayliss signed for EFL League One side Wigan Athletic on a season-long loan.

Shrewsbury Town
On 27 June 2022, Bayliss joined Shrewsbury Town on a two-year deal with the option for a further year after Preston had agreed to terminate his contract.

International career
On 16 July 2018, Bayliss was called up to the England U19 squad for the 2018 UEFA European Under-19 Championship. Bayliss made his International debut as a substitute against France and then recorded his first start in a defeat against Norway.

Career statistics

Honours
Coventry City
EFL League Two play-offs: 2018
Wigan Athletic
EFL League One: 2021–22

References

External links
Tom Bayliss player profile at ccfc.co.uk
Soccerbase profile

1999 births
Living people
English footballers
Association football midfielders
English Football League players
England youth international footballers
Coventry City F.C. players
Preston North End F.C. players
Wigan Athletic F.C. players
Shrewsbury Town F.C. players